Grünerløkka is a borough of the city of Oslo, Norway. Grünerløkka became part of the city of Oslo (then Christiania) in 1858. Grünerløkka was traditionally a working class district; however, since the late 20th century the area has increasingly undergone gentrification. Although it is located in the East End, it is more expensive than other parts of the East End.

Etymology
The first element was derived from the surname Grüner.  The last element is the definite form of løkke, meaning "paddock".

Grünerløkka was named after Friedrich Grüner (1628-1674) who served as chief administrator (Oberhauptmann) and the master of the mint (myntmester)  at  Christiania from  1651 until his death in 1674. Grüner purchased the Kings Mill (Kongens mølle) and surrounding acreage in the area from King Christian V of Denmark in 1672.

History
Thorvald Meyer (1818–1909) bought parts of the Grünerløkka area in 1861. The industrialist built the main street of Grünerløkka, now named  Thorvald Meyers gate. During the 19th century, Grünerløkka became a working-class area. Several factories were placed here because of the advantages of being located close to the Akerselva River. Christiania Seildugsfabrikk from 1856 and Aktieselskapet Herkules from 1898 were two of the factories established.

Grünerløkka is located with the parish of Paulus Church (Paulus kirke).  In 1866, Paulus parish had a total population of 13,600.  By 1900, the parish population had risen to 22,000. At that time, only five streets in Oslo had a population above 3000. Of these, three were located in Grünerløkka: Markveien, Thorvald Meyers gate and Toftes gate.  In 1864, a square meter had been priced at about 30 Norwegian shilling Active selling of property started in 1865. However, even as Thorvald Meyer  offered low-priced land, almost no one bought any of it until after 1868.

The park square called Olaf Ryes plass has its name from Norwegian-Danish General Olaf Rye (1791–1849). It was an open field well into the 1880s. The property was bought by Oslo kommune from members of the Grüner family  in 1883. A narrow diagonal street was built which led from Markveien to Thorvald Meyers gate. It had a stopping spot for horses and carriages at the middle point. This section  is now a pedestrian park square.

Politics 
As a borough of Oslo, Grünerløkka is governed by the city council of Oslo as well as its own borough council. The council leader is Geir Jensen from the Green Party and the deputy leader is Vemund Rundberget, of the Labour Party. The Green Party has the most seats. The 15 seats are distributed among the following political parties for the 2019-2023 term:

 4 from the Green Party (Miljøpartiet de Grønne)
 3 from the Labour Party (Arbeiderpartiet)
 3 from the Conservative Party (Høyre)
 2 from the Red Party (Rødt)
 2 from the Socialist Left Party (Sosialistisk Venstreparti)
 1 from the Liberal Party (Venstre)

Sports
The neighbourhood has its own sports club, Grüner, which was founded in 1914 with ice hockey and football as the most important activities. Grüner Fotball plays its home games at Dælenenga idrettspark and currently is part of the third division of the Norwegian football system. The ice hockey team plays the home games at Grünerhallen.

Notable landmarks
Sportsklubben av 1909
Alexander Kiellands plass (Oslo)
Åmodt bro
Ankerbrua
Ankertorget
Birkelunden
Blå
Foss Brewery
Foss videregående skole
Freia
Frydenberg
Grünerhallen
Keyserløkka
Kulturkirken Jakob
Kunsthøgskolen i Oslo
Olaf Ryes plass
Qadis
Parkteatret
Paulus kirke 
Prinds Christian Augusts Minde
Ring 2
Sagene ring
Schou Brewery
Sinsenkrysset
Sofienberg
Sofienberg kirke
Sofienberg Park

Gallery

References

Other sources
Tvedt, Knut Are, ed  (2000). "Grünerløkka" in Oslo byleksikon (Oslo: Kunnskapsforlaget. 4th ed. pp. 170–171)

External links 
 Grünerløkka, official website (City of Oslo) 
 Guide to Grünerløkka visitoslo.com 
 Munch's Grünerløkka

 
Boroughs of Oslo
Working class in Europe